Čestijanec is a village in northern Croatia, part of the Sveti Martin na Muri municipality within Međimurje County.

Geography

Čestijanec is located in part of Međimurje called Gornje Međimurje. Village is about 22 kilometres northwest from Čakovec, and some 110 kilometres north of Zagreb.
Settlement is situated in the alluvial plane of river Mur, on rivers right bank.

Čestijanec had a population of 114 in 2011 census.

References

Populated places in Međimurje County